Dommanget is a surname. Notable people with the surname include:

 Ghislaine Dommanget (1900–1991), French actress and the Princess consort of Monaco 
 Maurice Dommanget (1888–1976), French historian